The Bloomingdale Regional Library was originally designed to lessen patron usage at the Brandon Regional Library, which was the busiest library in the Hillsborough County System, at the beginning of the 21st century. In the early stages of development, the Bloomingdale Library was often referred to as the South Brandon Library because it was expected to serve people in the FishHawk, Bloomingdale, Valrico, and Lithia areas. Though there were several discussed sites for the creation of the library, the Hillsborough County Commissioners narrowed down their selection to two locations. One of the locations was across the street from Lithia Springs Elementary School on Lithia Pinecrest Road, while the other locality was  next to Bloomingdale High School on Bloomingdale Avenue.  Though  there were concerns regarding possible traffic congestion on Bloomingdale Avenue, the Commissioners ultimately decided to accept the latter option. This site was attractive for cost-saving reasons, as a member of the McLean family, offered to discount the acreage with an additional free acre.

Proposed blue prints for the library allowed for 15,000 square-feet with the possibility of adding an additional 10,000 at a later date. The space included a 3,770 square-foot reading room, a 1,150 square-foot children's room, and a 940 square-foot community collaboration room. Additional space was dedicated to meeting rooms and reading areas. With a holding of 53,000 books upon its day of opening, as well as the purchasing of thirty-five internet-accessible computers and the inclusion of free WI-fi, the Bloomingdale Library totaled in cost of $4.5 million. The library had a soft opening on February 7, 2005, and it officially started service on February 10.

Within a few months of opening, the Bloomingdale Library became a new home for the Greater Brandon Genealogy Society. The library specifically dedicated a genealogical research room with five computers that were directly linked to the John F. Germany's genealogical websites. In return for the genealogical center, the Greater Brandon Genealogy society offered to provide free tutoring for anyone interested in uncovering his or her family background. The genealogical center at Bloomingdale was the second in the county, with the John F. Germany acting as the only other center at the time of the former's creation.

The Bloomingdale Library was expanded by an additional 10,000 square-feet in 2013, thereby making it a regional library. This additional space was geared towards creating a larger children's room, community rooms, seating for studying, a larger Friends of the Library Book Store, and more area for technology and teen activities. A new vending cafe for patrons was also part of the $2.1 million expansion. In the year before the expansion, the library circulated over 660,000 books and other multimedia. The library also took advantage of federal funding to purchase an electric charging station for electric cars.
Cooking Oil Recycling Station: To support the recycling of cooking oil, the library has partnered with Hillsborough County Public Utilities and the C.O.R.E. program.
All cooking oils can cause problems in home plumbing and the sewage collection system.
Cooking oil recycling stations are available at some library locations countywide.

Friends of the Library

The Friends of the Bloomingdale Regional Library group is made up of citizens who support the library by raising money for special events and programs. One such event is the Friend’s annual Book Sale. One such special program is the award-winning Life Story Writing Workshop. The Friends operate their Book Ends Bookstore, located in the library's lobby.

Accessibility Information 
Bloomingdale Regional Library offers the following Assistive Technology for patrons who need assistance:

JAWS is screen reader and navigation software compatible with Microsoft Office and web browsers.

Dragon Speak reads aloud what is on the computer.

ZoomText enlarges print on the computer screen.

Keys-U-See keyboards have large print for the visually impaired.

2008 rape incident 
On the night of April 24, 2008, 18-year old Queena Vuong was returning books at the library when she was raped and beaten by 16-year-old Kendrick Morris. She suffered a skull fracture and numerous strokes from strangulation during the beating, leaving her paralyzed and blind. Morris was arrested when he returned to the library the next day. It was also discovered that he was also wanted for the rape of an elderly woman at a Clair-Mel day care center in 2007. In 2011, Morris was sentenced to 65 years in prison for the two charges; as he was a minor when he committed the crimes, he was ineligible for the life sentence. In March 2017, he was retried and sentenced to life in prison.

References

Public libraries in Florida